The World Rugby Tbilisi Cup is a rugby union competition that was first held in 2013 at Avchala Stadium in Tbilisi with the hosts Georgia joined by Uruguay, who regularly take part in the Nations Cup, and two newly founded teams: Emerging Ireland, who were made up of young Irish players that didn't get selected for the Lions tour to Australia or the national side's tour to North America, and a South Africa President's XV, composed of Currie Cup players.

Georgia was the only team to return for the second edition in 2014. They were joined by Spain and two teams that regularly take part in the IRB Nations Cup, Argentina Jaguars and Emerging Italy. In 2015, Emerging Ireland, Emerging Italy and Uruguay returned to the tournament, with Emerging Ireland claiming the title for the first ever time.

History

Teams
The teams that participated in the Tbilisi Cup and their finishing positions are as follows:

Statistics
Updated 21 June 2015 after 2015 World Rugby Tbilisi Cup.

Leading point scorers

Leading try scorers

See also 

 World Rugby Nations Cup
 World Rugby Pacific Nations Cup
 Americas Rugby Championship

References

External links

 
International rugby union competitions hosted by Georgia (country)
Tbilisi Cup
Sport in Tbilisi